Bhupinder Singh Gujjar is an Indian professional wrestler currently signed to Impact Wrestling.

Professional wrestling career

Early career
Gujjar trained under The Great Khali at Continental Wrestling Entertainment. He made his professional wrestling debut on March 16, 2019.

Impact Wrestling (2019, 2022–present)
Gujjar made a single appearance under the ring name Bhupinder Singh as part of the Desi Hit Squad in 2019. On the February 3, 2022 episode of Impact, Gujjar, under his real name, made his Impact in-ring debut against John Skyler in a winning effort. At Emergence faced Brian Myers for the Impact Digital Media Championship and lost. After a controversial disqualification victory in a Digital Media Championship match against Gujjar, Myers would settle his feud with Gujjar by defeating him in a ladder match on the September 22 episode of Impact!.

Championships and accomplishments
Chem Valley Wrestling
CVW Championship (1 time, current)
Impact Wrestling
Impact Year End Awards (1 time)
 One to Watch in 2023 (2022)
Pro Wrestling Illustrated
Ranked No. 298 of the top 500 singles wrestlers in the PWI 500 in 2022

References

External links
 

Date of birth missing (living people)
Living people
Sportspeople from Chandigarh
Indian male professional wrestlers
Indian expatriate sportspeople in the United States
Expatriate professional wrestlers
Year of birth missing (living people)
21st-century professional wrestlers